Sclanizza is an Italian surname. Notable people with the surname include:

 Scilla Sclanizza (1926–2006), Italian actress
 Umberto Sclanizza (1893–1951), Italian actor

Italian-language surnames